Julio José Iglesias Rouget (born 26 September 1972) is a Spanish retired footballer who played as a goalkeeper.

Club career
Born in Avilés, Asturias, Iglesias spent most of his professional career in the second division, with two stints in La Liga: in the 2001–02 season he appeared in 16 games for CD Tenerife, which were relegated, and played second-fiddle to Albano Bizzarri in the following campaign, playing no matches for Real Valladolid.

Over the course of 15 seasons, Julio Iglesias appeared in exactly 300 games in the second level, mainly for FC Barcelona B, Albacete Balompié and Xerez CD (three years apiece). He retired in June 2009 at the age of 36, then worked as a goalkeeper coach.

Honours
Spain U16
UEFA European Under-16 Championship: 1988

References

External links

1972 births
Living people
People from Avilés
Spanish footballers
Footballers from Asturias
Association football goalkeepers
La Liga players
Segunda División players
Segunda División B players
FC Barcelona Atlètic players
Real Avilés CF footballers
UD Almería players
CD Leganés players
Albacete Balompié players
CD Tenerife players
Real Valladolid players
Algeciras CF footballers
Xerez CD footballers
Córdoba CF players
Spain youth international footballers